Horace Cheung Kwok-kwan, JP (born 30 June 1974) is a Hong Kong solicitor and politician and the former vice-chairman of the Democratic Alliance for the Betterment and Progress of Hong Kong (DAB), the largest pro-Beijing party in Hong Kong. He was elected to Legislative Council of Hong Kong in 2016 through the Hong Kong Island constituency, and re-elected in 2021 through the Election Committee constituency. He is the current Deputy Secretary for Justice.

Career
Cheung graduated from the City University of Hong Kong with a bachelor's degree in law and is a partner of Cheung & Yeung solicitors. He joined the DAB in 2000 and worked closely with the then party chairman Ma Lik as the vice-chairman of the Wan Chai branch, party of Ma's Hong Kong Island constituency. He took in charge of the party's 800-member youth wing when it was created in 2004. With his young age with professional background, Cheung is a high-flier in the party. In 2011, he became the vice-chairman of the DAB.

He contested in the 2003 District Council elections in Stubbs Road but was defeated. In the 2004 Legislative Council elections, he was placed in the DAB list behind Ma Lik and Choy So-yuk and was not elected. In 2008 Legislative Council elections, he was placed the fourth behind Tsang Yok-sing, Choy So-yuk and Christopher Chung and did not get elected. In 2011 District Council elections, he won a seat in Sai Wan constituency in the Central and Western District Council by 24 votes against a Democratic Party candidate. He was elected to the Election Committee in the Election Committee sub-sector elections through the Urban District Councils Sub-sector in 2011. He lost his seat in the 2019 District Council elections.

He has been appointed to various public positions including membership on the Administrative Appeals Board, Buildings Appeal Tribunal Panel, Central Policy Unit, Estate Agents Authority, Long Term  housing Strategy Steering Committee, Standing Committee on Disciplined Services Salaries and Conditions of Service and Steering Committee on the regulation of the sale of first-hand residential properties by legislation. He is member of the Disciplinary and Investigate Panels of the Hong Kong Institute of Certified Public Accountants (HKICPA).

He was elected to Legislative Council of Hong Kong in 2016 through the Hong Kong Island constituency.

In April 2021, Cheung criticized the Hong Kong Bar Association, and said that the group had commented too often on political issues.

On 18 June 2022, he resigned from the Legislative Council and the DAB to become the Deputy Secretary for Justice.

In December 2022, Cheung said that asking the NPCSC to interpret Hong Kong's national security law is the "healthiest way" for the legal system to develop, after the government appealed to Beijing to block Jimmy Lai from using UK lawyer Tim Owen.

In February 2023, after a trip to the Middle East, Cheung said that no government officials or business leaders asked him about the national security law, and said that those in the Middle East "are not easily swayed by inaccurate or incorrect information."

Personal life 
In September 2022, Cheung tested positive for COVID-19.

References

1974 births
Living people
Hong Kong people of Hakka descent
People from Huiyang
Alumni of the City University of Hong Kong
District councillors of Central and Western District
Solicitors of Hong Kong
Democratic Alliance for the Betterment and Progress of Hong Kong politicians
Members of the Election Committee of Hong Kong, 2012–2017
Members of the Election Committee of Hong Kong, 2021–2026
HK LegCo Members 2016–2021
HK LegCo Members 2022–2025
Hong Kong pro-Beijing politicians
Members of the Executive Council of Hong Kong